Elmir Alimzhanov,  (born 5 October 1986, in Alma-Ata) is a Kazakhstani right-handed fencer. He ranked 2nd in the Fencing Asian Championships 2008, 2011, and 2012 and 1st in the Asian Championship 2013. He took part to the 2012 Summer Olympics. He ranked 11th in the Olympics in 2012.

References

1986 births
Living people
Sportspeople from Almaty
Kazakhstani male épée fencers
Fencers at the 2012 Summer Olympics
Olympic fencers of Kazakhstan
Fencers at the 2010 Asian Games
Fencers at the 2014 Asian Games
Fencers at the 2018 Asian Games
Asian Games silver medalists for Kazakhstan
Asian Games bronze medalists for Kazakhstan
Asian Games medalists in fencing
Medalists at the 2010 Asian Games
Medalists at the 2014 Asian Games
Medalists at the 2018 Asian Games
Universiade medalists in fencing
Universiade bronze medalists for Kazakhstan
Medalists at the 2013 Summer Universiade
20th-century Kazakhstani people
21st-century Kazakhstani people